Husaren in Berlin is a 1971 East German film directed by Erwin Stranka.

Plot summary

Cast 
Manfred Krug as Andreas Hatik von Futak
Evelyn Opoczynski as Andrea
István Iglódi
Rolf Herricht as Augustin
Gábor Agárdi
Antol Farkas
Herwart Grosse as von Rochow
Norbert Christian as Splitgerber
Siegfried Weiß as Gotzkowsky
Günter Rüger as Kowacz
Günter Schubert as Toth
Hans Klering as Wegelin
Frantisek Velecký as Cziczery
Holger Mahlich as Kalkstein
Ivan Malré as Gesandter
Lutz Jahoda as Dolfi
Helmut Schreiber as Van Dessau
Lajos Farkas as Lajos
Ilse Voigt as Königsmutter
Lilo Grahn as Frau Splitgerber
Marianne Christina Schilling as Frau von Rochow
Horst Kube as Oskar
Agnes Kraus as Friedchen
Peter Dommisch as Egon
Axel Triebel as Adolar
Friedrich Teitge as Stadtschreiber
Ursula Am-Ende as Amalie
Hertha Thiele as Frau Camas
Willi Neuenhahn as Pötsch
Kurt Sperling as Borcke
Jochen Diestelmann as Van Finckenstein
Kurt Radeke as Pöllnitz
Franz List (actor) as Wartensleben
Friedrich Wilhelm Dann as Von Boden
Antal Farkas as Tschurtschenthaler
Hans Feldner as Lakai
Hans Flössel as Mime
Werner Schmidt-Winkelmann as Herr Schulze

Soundtrack

External links 

1971 films
1971 comedy films
German comedy films
East German films
1970s German-language films
Films set in Berlin
Films set in Prussia
Films set in the 1750s
Seven Years' War films
1970s German films